Micaela Rodríguez Cuesta (19 June 1935 – 29 March 1991), known professionally as Mikaela, was a Spanish singer and actress. She began her film career in 1956 and played her first starring role in the Spanish film The Red Rose (1960). Her signature song, "La luna y el toro" (1964), was a number-one hit in Spain and earned her an award in 1965. She died on 29 March 1991 from leucemia.

Selected filmography
 The Life of Agustín Lara (1959)
 The Red Rose (1960)
 Queen of the Tabarin Club (1960)
 Duello nel Texas (1963)
 Agent 077: From the Orient with Fury (1965)
 Madamigella di Maupin (1966)
 High Season for Spies (1966)

References

External links
Mikaela (official site)

1935 births
1991 deaths
20th-century Spanish actresses
20th-century Spanish singers
20th-century Spanish women singers
Actresses from Andalusia
Singers from Andalusia
Deaths from leukemia
People from Seville
Spanish film actresses